Fort Row, located on the south bank of the Verdigris River and east of the present town of Coyville, Kansas, was built in the fall of 1861, probably in October.  It was built by the local mounted militia for their use. However, the fort became associated with one of the worst human tragedies of the Civil War.

The militia was formed in summer 1861 to defend the area against raids by Confederate guerrillas who operated in eastern Kansas. John R. Row, for whom the fort was named, was chosen as the militia's captain. The militia had seventy to eighty men when it was organized.

Fort Row was built in a very flat area allowing for a good view of the surrounding land. The river provided a good barrier, as the bank was very steep.  Three log blockhouses were built, measuring sixteen by twenty-four feet each. A six-foot log stockade surrounded three sides, with the river side being protected by the steep bank. An earthwork embankment was built along the stockade and rifle portholes were cut into the stockade walls. The stockade enclosed about a half acre of land.

The militia members stayed in the fort for the winter, keeping their horses inside the stockade. In the spring they abandoned Fort Row, when they joined the 9th Kansas Volunteers. Fort Row, however, is more well known for the fate of about 10,000 destitute Indians who arrived there in January 1862 seeking help to survive the harsh winter.

Creek Indian leader Opothleyahola had a following of 12,000 to 13,000 in Indian Territory. Confederate leaders hoped he would join them, but he sought to keep his people on neutral ground and avoid the conflict of the Civil War. His plan for neutrality failed and in late 1861 the Creeks under him (defections to the Confederates cut his followers to about 9,000) and at least 2,600 Indians of other tribes headed for Fort Row.

The Indians fought Confederate forces twice, on December 26 suffering a devastating defeat forcing Opothleyahola's people to flee with next to nothing.  Many were shoeless and many were naked or nearly so. They had no food and were forced to march 100 to 150 miles through snow and bitter cold before reaching Fort Row.  The Creeks lost 2,000 to 3,000 on the way and more would have died, had they not eaten some of their dogs and ponies. The Indians expected help, but their numbers completely overwhelmed all efforts to help them.

In the middle of January 1862 the first groups of Indians, more than 2,000, arrived at the fort. Twenty to sixty Indians arrived per day until approximately 10,000 had arrived.  In late January or early February, William G. Coffin, the regional superintendent for Indian affairs, arrived to help. He spent $10,000 for supplies, which quickly ran out. He managed to use credit to get more supplies and he and his son Oliver, who was assisting him, used their salaries to buy more goods.

At first the Army helped feed the Indians, but Coffin inherited the task of feeding the Indians by February. He obtained some help, which was still completely inadequate. Physicians attempted to help the starving and Indians and had to amputate many frostbitten limbs. The Indians attempted to hunt game, which was quickly depleted. Thousands of ponies and dogs died from starvation and lack of shelter and many of the dogs and ponies were eaten. At least 1,000 Indians died, including Opthleyahola's daughter, who died at Belmont, Kansas.

Many of the dead Indians were placed into hollow logs and trees. Since the ground was frozen, those who were buried were put into shallow graves hacked out of the ground. Probably most of the human and animal dead were never buried. When the weather warmed, a terrible stench hung in the air.
———
Edit by native Kansan: Local oral tradition tells a different story. The Indians, who did not want to fight for the confederacy, wrote to Abraham Lincoln, begging for sanctuary. He wrote back telling them if they could make it as far as fort Row his soldiers would be there to feed and protect them. When they arrived the fort was deserted and a local man took it upon himself to do his best to care for them.  As for the manner in which the bodies of the dead Indians were disposed of, it is widely told locally, by those who were told by their grandparents and great grandparents, that the dead could not be buried because of the frozen ground, and so were rolled over the steep bank into the river. After the thaw, the bodies had accumulated to the extent that the water of the Verdigris River would not flow. Dynamite was used to blast the dam of human and animal bones free. The stories of human bones still littering the field at the site and the banks of the Verdigris is correct. (I have been there many times and have seen them.) the site is also littered with native artifacts. Another “common knowledge” tale is that because the government did not want to be responsible for feeding the native Americans, blankets infected with small pox were sent by the government to the fort, which decimated the population and contributed to the horrific number of casualties. Locals would not go near the fort then because of the pox, so those who did not die from the disease died of hunger and cold. The locals do not view this as a conspiracy theory, but as a necessary evil, since the presence of so many hungry “savages” caused hardship on the surrounding communities and decimated the game they felt was rightfully theirs to feed their own families. The site of the fort proper is not marked. There is a small monument about a quarter mile away which says the site is unknown, but a little wandering soon allowed us to discover it beyond doubt. The land is now privately owned.
——-
To alleviate the suffering, the Indians were over time moved to Fort Belmont and a U.S. Army post at LeRoy, Kansas (see LeRoy's post). Conditions were still harsh at Fort Belmont. A number of young Indian men were enlisted to fight for the Union from all three posts.

By the time Fort Row was abandoned in the spring, all the Indians had been moved elsewhere. Fort Row was never again used and eventually the buildings were destroyed by floods. For many years human and animal bones littered the surrounding countryside.

References

Row
Buildings and structures in Wilson County, Kansas
1861 establishments in Kansas